Les Harrison (born 29 January 1945) is a former Australian rules footballer who played with Melbourne in the Victorian Football League (VFL).

Notes

External links 		
		
Les Harrison on Demonwiki
				
		
1945 births
Living people
Australian rules footballers from Victoria (Australia)		
Melbourne Football Club players